The 2001 Norwegian Football Cup Final was the final match of the 2001 Norwegian Football Cup, the 96th season of the Norwegian Football Cup, the premier Norwegian football cup competition organized by the Football Association of Norway (NFF). The match was played on 4 November 2001 at the Ullevaal Stadion in Oslo, and opposed two Tippeligaen sides Bryne and Viking. Viking defeated Bryne 3–0 to claim the Norwegian Cup for a fifth time in their history. Despite the victory, the Viking's players reported for training at 2 p.m. the next day.

Match

Details

References

2001
Viking FK matches
Bryne FK matches
Football Cup
Sports competitions in Oslo
November 2001 sports events in Europe
2000s in Oslo